"Don't Say" is a song performed by Jon B, issued as the lead single from his second studio album Cool Relax and produced by Jon-John. The song peaked at #68 on the Billboard Hot 100 in 1997.

Music video

The official music video was directed by Kevin Bray and features Sanaa Lathan as Jon B's love interest.

Chart positions

References

550 Music singles
1997 songs
1997 singles
Jon B. songs
Music videos directed by Kevin Bray (director)
Song recordings produced by Marc Nelson
Song recordings produced by Jon-John Robinson
Songs written by Marc Nelson
Songs written by Jon-John Robinson